The 11th Australian Academy of Cinema and Television Arts Awards (generally known as the AACTA Awards) is an award's ceremony to celebrate the best of Australian films and television of 2021. The main ceremony occurred on 8 December 2021 at the Sydney Opera House and was broadcast on Network 10 and Fox Arena, returning to Network 10 after a six year absence.

Feature film
The nominations are as follows:

Television

Documentary

Short form and online

Additional awards

References

External links
 Official AACTA website

AACTA Awards ceremonies
2021 in Australian cinema